British Overseas citizenship is a form of British nationality under the British Nationality Act 1983. BOCs are British nationals but do not have the right of abode in the United Kingdom. This citizenship is normally for certain people who retained British nationality after independence (e.g. Kenya), but do not have enough ties with the United Kingdom to be British Citizens.

Visa requirements for other classes of British nationals such as British citizens, British Nationals (Overseas), British Overseas Territories Citizens, British Protected Persons or British Subjects are different.

Visa requirements map

Visa requirements

British Crown Dependencies and Overseas Territories

Territories

Right to consular protection

When in a country where there is no British embassy, British Overseas citizens have the right to get consular protection from the embassy of any other commonwealth country present in that country.

See also List of diplomatic missions of the United Kingdom.

Non-visa restrictions

Foreign travel statistics

See also

British Overseas citizen
British passport
Visa requirements for British citizens
Visa requirements for British Overseas Territories Citizens
Visa requirements for British Nationals (Overseas)

References and Notes
References

Notes

British Overseas Citizens